Calathidius is a genus of ground beetles in the family Carabidae. There are at least three described species in Calathidius, found in the Canary Islands.

Species
These three species belong to the genus Calathidius:
 Calathidius acuminatus (Wollaston, 1862)
 Calathidius brevithorax Machado, 1992
 Calathidius sphodroides (Wollaston, 1862)

References

Platyninae